Strandveld is a coastal region of the Western Cape province of South Africa. The region is mostly shrublands.

It comprises the towns and villages of Stanford, Gansbaai, Uilenkraalsmond, Franskraal, De Kelders, Baardskeerdersbos and Wolvengat. Elim, Napier and Bredasdorp form the northern border towards L'Agulhas. Soetendalsvlei is the largest lake in the region.

References 

Geography of the Western Cape